Candela (Spanish for candle and/ or fire) is a San Francisco-based nine piece salsa music and Latin jazz band created in 1986 under the direction of Uruguayan born lead singer and conga drummer Edgardo Cambón. It consists of piano, bass, trombones, conga drums, bongo drums, timbalesFlute and vocals.
"Candela" is one of the "oldest" Salsa Bands, in the Bay Area, having performed consistently an average of 4 performances a month for over 30 years!

Edgardo Cambón arrived to San-Francisco in 1986 and made records with Chucho Valdés (with Irakere, 1994), Keith Terry & Cross Pulse, Joan Baez, Claudia Gomez,  Omar Sosa, Mark Levine, Jeff Narell, Andy Narell, Sovosó,  Mike Spiro, Rebeca Mauleón, Jackie Rago, Richard Olsen Big Band, Los Compas, Sol y Luna Band, Eddie Montalvo, Johnny "Dandy" Rodriguez, Armando Perazza and many others. Edgardo also taught workshops in Afro-Cuban percussion and vocals in many universities around the world. He also taught percussion for 5 years at Folsom State Prison as part of the rehabilitation program 

The Bands repertoire includes various kinds of Latin music: Salsa, Son, Bolero, Mambo, Cha-cha-chá, Merengue, Timba, Bachata, Cumbia and Latin Jazz.

Members
The band includes the following musicians, which have other musical history and commitments as well:
Marco Diaz, piano; Charlie Gurke on Saxes; Jeff Cressman, Greg Saul and Abel Figueroa, trombones; Edgardo Cambón, vocals & congas; Omar Ledezma, bongo drums & background vocals; David Belove, bass, Julio Areas, timbales & background vocals and Miguel Martinez on flute and vocals. Many great musicians play occasionally with this 30 years Bay Area musical treasure, like Doug Beavers (Spanish Harlem Orchestra and Eddie Palmieri) on Trombone, Karl Perazzo (from Santana and Avance bands), pianist Israel Tanenbaum, Jesus Diaz and Christian Pepin rotate on percussion as well.

Recordings 
Ilusiones (1990),  Orfeo, Uruguay
Madre Rumba, Padre Son (2000),  Pan Caliente Records, United States
Their third CD, Celebrando 20 Años ("Celebrating 20th Anniversary")released in late 2008 is available now on iTunes and at http://cdbaby.com/cd/edgardo2. 
The recently released 4th Cd "Tatuajes Del Alma" has received rave reviews for its variety of styles, presenting not just Salsa rhythms but also expanding to Samba (Brazil) and Candombe (Uruguay).
All of "Candela's" Cds feature mainly compositions and lyrics by Edgardo Cambon with an array of great arrangers like: Rebeca Mauleón, Wayne Wallace, John Calloway, Marco Diaz, Charlie Gurke among others.
 The Band can be often seen playing in Salsa Clubs all around the Bay Area, places like Café Cocomo, Club Montero's, Shattuck Down Low. El Rio, Yoshi's, San Francisco and San José Jazz Festivals, Club Senzala in Sunnyvale, Cigar Bar (SF), The Seahorse in Sausalito Ca. and many more.

References

External links
An interview with Salsa Power, June 23, 2002

Salsa music groups
Afro-Cuban jazz ensembles
Musical groups from San Francisco
Musical groups established in 1987